Persistent data in the field of data processing denotes information that is infrequently accessed and not likely to be modified.

Static data is information, for example a record, that does not change and may be intended to be permanent. It may have previously been categorized as persistent or dynamic.

Dynamic data (also known as transactional data) is information that is asynchronously updated as new information becomes available. Updates to dynamic data may come at any time, with periods of inactivity in between.

See also
JBND, Java library for programs handling persistent data
Persistent data structure
Persistent memory
Phantom OS - persistent operation system implementing concept of persistent data

References

Computer data